Akyokuş is a village in the Karakoçan District of Elazığ Province in Turkey. The village is populated by Kurds of the Izol tribe and had a population of 67 in 2021.

References

Villages in Karakoçan District
Kurdish settlements in Elazığ Province